The Morgan 24/25, is an American trailerable sailboat that was designed by Charles Morgan as a racer-cruiser and first built in 1965.

The design concept was originally conceived by Morgan as a boat with a length overall (LOA) of under , to be marketed as the Morgan 24. By the time the design was finalized and produced the LOA had become , although Morgan never got around to changing the model designation. When Morgan Yachts was bought out by the Gerber Products Company in 1972, their marketing department re-designated it as the Morgan 25. Since boats made under either designation are similar, it is commonly referred to as the Morgan 24/25. The boat was later reintroduced under the designation Morgan Classic 250.

Production
The design was built by Morgan Yachts in the United States between 1965 and 1976, with 460 boats completed, but it is now out of production.

Design
The Morgan 24/25 is a recreational keelboat, built predominantly of fiberglass, with wood trim. It has a masthead sloop rig with aluminum spars, a spooned raked stem, a plumb transom, an internally mounted spade-type rudder controlled by a tiller and a fixed modified long keel, with a retractable centerboard. It displaces  and carries  of lead ballast.

The boat is fitted with a Universal Atomic 4 gasoline engine or a small  outboard motor for docking and maneuvering.

The design has sleeping accommodation for four people, with a double "V"-berth in the bow cabin and two straight settee berths in the main cabin. The galley is located on both sides, admidships, just aft of the bow cabin. The galley is equipped with a two-burner stove and food locker to port and a sink and ice box to starboard. The head is located in between the bow cabin "V"-berths. There was also an alternate interior with a dinette table to port.

Operational history
In a 2010 review Steve Henkel wrote, "in 1990 we moved from Connecticut to Florida and found a 1968 Morgan 25 'project boat' to fix up ... We loved the boat, and won races with our local sailing club fleet in Sarasota, FL. Best features: The boat is fast, weatherly, and especially good in light air. She’s also an easy singlehander and terrific weekender for two. Her hull is easily driven; our 6 hp Yamaha with a high-thrust prop easily drove her at hull speed. Worst features: There were problems with the centerboard pendant system, which involved a rod passing through a packing gland—a real Rube Goldberg affair."

In a 2016 review Darrell Nicholson wrote in Practical Sailor, "she's fast and roomy, but plagued by centerboard problems that are tough to avoid." Of its sailing qualities, he wrote, "the long, deep board helps the 24/25 to point high, and its low wetted surface, especially with board up, gives extra speed on reaches and runs. The boat performs best in 5 to 15 knots of breeze, but can handle much higher winds when properly reefed, though several owners reported that the boat could be a bit stiffer. The 24/25 is unusually well balanced, and in ordinary weather can be made to self-steer on a beat or close reach with tiller lashed. However, in very heavy air carrying a chute, it has a marked tendency to broach."

See also
List of sailing boat types

References

Keelboats
1960s sailboat type designs
Sailing yachts
Trailer sailers
Sailboat type designs by Charley Morgan
Sailboat types built by Morgan Yachts